Pajawan or Pajjun was the 5th Kachhwaha ruler of the Kingdom of Amber.  He belonged to the Kachhwaha Rajput clan who had migrated to Rajputana in the 12th century. He was married to Prithviraj Chauhan's cousin and was a prominent and trusted general of Prithviraj. Pajwan fought 64 important battles in his military career.

Reign
According to the Prithviraj Raso, Pajawan played a role in the battles at Hansi and Nagour, fighting alongside Prithviraj Chauhan, who subsequently appointed Pajawan the governor of Mahoba.

He also helped Prithviraj in defeating Bhimdev, a Solanki king of Gujarat.

In 1185, Raja Jaichand of Kannauj organised the  Swayamvara of his daughter Sanyogita, inviting all the prominent kings and princes to the ceremony, but deliberately avoiding Prithviraj Chauhan. Furthermore, he placed an earthen statue of Prithviraj at the entrance of the venue, posing him as the doorman. Prithviraj got information about it. He arrived at Kannauj in disguise together with his trusted generals, one of which was Pajawan. When Sanyogita chose Prithviraj as her would-be husband by placing the garland on the statue of Prithviraj, he took her with him on a horse and escaped. The pursuing forces of Jaichand then engaged with Pajawan in a fierce battle.

Death and succession
Pajawan fought for the victorious army in the First Battle of Tarain. However, he died soon after the battle. The poet Chand Bardai called him bravest of the allies of Chauhan. He was succeeded by his son Malesi Kacchwaha.

References

Sources

History of Jaipur